Peter John Edward Trew (born 30 April 1932) is a former British Conservative Party politician. He has also been a civil engineer and company director.

At the 1970 general election, he was elected on his second attempt to become the Member of Parliament (MP) for Dartford, defeating Labour incumbent Sydney Irving by 560 votes. However, Irving regained the seat at the February 1974 general election.

References 

https://web.archive.org/web/20110811175541/http://www.politicsresources.net/area/uk/ge70/i06.htm
 Times Guide to the House of Commons February 1974

External links 
 

1932 births
Living people
Conservative Party (UK) MPs for English constituencies
UK MPs 1970–1974